Nepean is a provincial electoral district that has existed from 1987 to 1999, and again since 2018. The riding was re-created federally with the 2012 redistribution process. That same process was followed by the Ontario government, meaning the provincial ridings follow a similar boundary division for the 2018 provincial election.

Riding history
Nepean was created in 1987 out of part of Carleton. It was represented by a Liberal MPP for eight years before it was won by then 25-year-old Progressive Conservative John Baird. Baird represented Nepean for four years. In 1999, the provincial redistribution resulted in Nepean being abolished as it was split between the new Ottawa West—Nepean and Nepean—Carleton ridings.

2018 return
Provincial law has required that southern Ontario's electoral boundaries have the same boundaries provincially and federally. The federal boundaries were redistributed in 2012 in time for the 2015 federal election, meaning Ontario's first provincial election under the new boundaries was the 2018 election.

Members of Provincial Parliament

Electoral results

Nepean, 2018-Present

Nepean, 1987-1999

References

External links
Map of riding for 2018 election

Ontario provincial electoral districts
Provincial electoral districts of Ottawa